The General Office of the Central Military Commission, simply known as the CMC General Office or the Military Office, is an administrative agency of the Central Military Commission which assists the leaders with the day to day administrative operations of the CMC.

See also 

 Central Military Commission (China)
 General Office
 General Office of the Chinese Communist Party
 General Office of the State Council

References 

Central Military Commission (China)
Defence agencies of China